Sigma Theta Epsilon was an interdenominational national Christian fraternal organization whose last active chapter appears to have ceased operations in .

Background

Origin of the Name
The name "Sigma Theta Epsilon" finds its roots in the Greek words, "Sunergoi Theou Esman", meaning "Fellow Workers with God". This is taken from I Corinthians 3:9, and should be a constant reminder of our duty as a Christian Brotherhood.

History
A group of Methodist men in the Wesley Foundation at the University of South Dakota, Vermillion, South Dakota, had been carrying on a program as a religious fraternity, which they called Phi Lambda Phi, for some time when it occurred to them that perhaps the men in other Wesley Foundations had similar groups which could be mutually helpful if they should form a union. The idea was brought up at the student council retreat at Ames, Iowa, in 1924 and 1925. They sent an invitation to all Wesley Foundation units asking those interested to send representatives to an organizational meeting. This meeting was held at Lincoln, Nebraska on February 6–7, 1925. The delegates drew up articles of federation and elected National Officers, thus a National Religious Fraternity for Methodist Men became known as Phi Tau Theta (meaning "Friends of God").

On October 8, 1936, another group of Christian men met and started a fraternity. The meeting was held at Indiana University, and there, Sigma Epsilon Theta was formed.

In 1939, a delegation of Phi Tau Theta approached the National Officers of Sigma Epsilon Theta and proposed a merger of the two National Fraternities. During Thanksgiving break, 1941, "Delta Sigma Theta" was formed. The transition from two fraternities to one was smooth, largely due to careful preparation by the officers.  However, when all seemed to be going well, Delta Sigma Theta (a sorority) threatened suit against the new fraternity for use of their name. The name Sigma Theta Epsilon was selected during Easter break 1949.

After a period of expansion, inactivity of the chapters (high in number - low in spirit) persuaded the National Conclave of 1968 to appoint a committee to examine the philosophy of the fraternity. The committee suggested that the fraternity change from its original emphasis as a National Religious Fraternity for Methodist Men. This change saw a decrease in enrollment due to lessened support by the Wesley Foundation. The National Cabinet Meeting of 1972 realized that Sigma Theta Epsilon had evolved into a National Christian Service Fraternity, and thus adopted purposes centered on three main areas: religious, service, and social. These purposes were revised at the Conclave of 1975 into the four Purposes of Sigma Theta Epsilon identified today.

Still, chapters were lost to dormancy. A low point was reached in 1975 when only two active units remained: Alpha Gamma chapter at West Virginia Wesleyan College and newly formed Epsilon chapter at Ohio Northern University. The following years almost saw the dissolving of Sigma Theta Epsilon as a National Fraternity. The addition of a new Delta chapter, the second of that name, at Mount Union College in April 1980 stimulated new optimism and growth for the fraternity. 

In 1988 Sigma Theta Epsilon struggled again through some growing pains. Delta chapter had all but disappeared while Alpha Gamma chapter's numbers began to fall. But 1988 also saw the start of the Beta Alpha chapter in Oklahoma City. This new chapter grew rapidly, and soon vied with Epsilon chapter as the fraternity's largest. Beta Alpha's designation marked what was hoped to be a rebirth for the fraternity, and all chapters from this point on would be named in succession following Beta Alpha.

Whereas previously the Fraternity had used a standard naming system of Greek alphabetical succession, at some point it began to use a state model, naming a new chapter "Alpha chapter of Texas" for example, that had been formed in 1999. 

This excitement carried into Spring 1993, when Beta Beta chapter at Miami University of Ohio was formed. An excited group of men gathered together and quickly grew to be as solid as any chapter. In the fall of 1993, Delta chapter at Mt. Union put together its first pledge class in almost five years. Led by an alumnus of Epsilon chapter, who had been teaching at Mount Union College, these men revived the Delta chapter just weeks before the National Fraternity was to absorb their charter and assets.

The fraternity didn't see National Growth again until 1998, when on January 31, the Beta Gamma chapter was initiated at the University of Cincinnati. Thus began a substantial period of National Growth that continues today.  Spring Conclave 1999 saw the formal initiation of a group of men from Our Lady of the Lake University in San Antonio, Texas as Beta Delta chapter. This group of men would mark themselves as one of the most active chapters in the Nation.

At the 2000 Spring Conclave, a group of men from Bradley University in Peoria, Illinois pledged as a temporary club. These same men were formally initiated as Beta Epsilon chapter at The English Chapel at Ohio Northern University during the East Regional Fall Gathering on October 21, 2000.

At the West Regional Fall Gathering at Oklahoma City University, Oklahoma City, Oklahoma, a group of men from Northeastern State University in Tahlequah, Oklahoma were formally initiated as the Beta Zeta chapter on October 26, 2002. Their road to establishing a chapter was a rocky one to say the least, but their persistence prevailed.

On April 5, 2003, the Beta Eta chapter was formally initiated at Spring Conclave in St. Louis, Missouri. These men from West Virginia University were blessed to have pledged under the supervision of the sitting National President, Chad Burdette, while he was completing graduate studies there.

The addition of the Beta Kappa chapter brought the number of chapters nationally to eleven. This was the highest number seen since the 1960s. 

A period of growth ceased, and as of  there appears to be a single active chapter, at Our Lady of the Lake University; the other chapters of the fraternity are dormant.

Chapters
Chapters of Sigma Theta Epsilon include the following.  Active chapters noted in bold, inactive chapters noted in italics. 

Alpha – Iowa State University, 1925–1967
Beta - University of Nebraska, 1925–1965
Gamma – University of South Dakota, 1925–1960
Delta – University of Minnesota, 1925–1951 
Epsilon – University of Iowa, 1927–1941
Zeta – University of California, Berkeley, 1928–1931
Eta – University of Northern Iowa, 1929–1962, 1966–1971
Theta – Ohio University 1931-43, 1945–1972
Iota – University of Wyoming, 1931–1934
Kappa – Ohio State University, 1934–1968
Lambda – Kansas State University, 1936–1943, 1952–1965
Mu – West Virginia University, 1938–1970
Nu – Oklahoma State University, 1939–1971
Xi – Indiana University, 1936–1957
Omicron – Miami University, 1937–1962
Pi – Bowling Green State University, 1937–1942, 1952–1958, 1960–1962
Rho – Fort Hays State University, 1948–1959
Sigma – Kent State University, 1948–1971
Tau – University of Oklahoma, 1949–1968
Upsilon – University of Nebraska at Kearney, 1950–1953
Phi – University of Michigan, 1950–1953
Epsilon (2) – Oklahoma City University, 1950–1954
Zeta (2) – University of Wisconsin–Stevens Point, 1952–1954,
Chi – Pittsburg State University, 1952–1953, 1960–1968
Iota (2) – University of Iowa, 1954–1960
Psi – Southwestern Oklahoma State University, 1955–1957
Omega – Unassigned.  Memorial chapter?
Alpha Alpha – Michigan State University, 1956–1962
Alpha Beta – Western Michigan University, 1956–1974
Alpha Gamma – West Virginia Wesleyan College, 1957–2012
Alpha Delta – Pennsylvania State University, 1958–1965, 1967–1970
Alpha Epsilon – American University, 1960–1969
Alpha Zeta – Central Michigan University, 1961–1963, 1966–1971
Gamma (2) – Mansfield University, 1967–1971
Beta (2) – Lane College, 1974–1975
Alpha chapter of Ohio – Ohio Northern University 1975–2021 
Eta (2) – Northern Illinois University, 1976–1977
Delta (2) – Mount Union College, 1969-1975, 1980–1987, 1994-2011
Beta Alpha – Oklahoma City University, 1988–2003
Beta Beta – Miami University, 1993–2008
Beta Gamma – University of Cincinnati, 1998–2011
Alpha chapter of Texas, Our Lady of the Lake University, 1999- 2022 
Beta Epsilon – Bradley University, 2000–2012
Beta Zeta – Northeastern State University, 2002–2015
Beta Eta – West Virginia University, 2002-2011
Beta Theta – Ohio University, 2003–2006, 2009-2010
Beta Iota – Illinois Wesleyan University, 2004–2006
Beta Kappa – Missouri Valley College, 2006–2007

Notes

References

External links
 Sigma Theta Epsilon

Christian fraternities and sororities in the United States
Student organizations established in 1925
1925 establishments in Nebraska